Public History Weekly. The Open Peer Review Journal is an  open peer-reviewed academic journal on all aspects of public history addressing a wider audience to popularize academic research and debates.

Overview
The journal was established in 2013 and is published by Walter de Gruyter on behalf of four universities from Austria (University of Vienna), Poland (University of Wrocław), and Switzerland (Universities of Education in Basel/Brugg and in Lucerne) as well as of the International Federation for Public History. The journal publishes in English and in German and additionally in the mother tongue of each author. The journal has the explicit aim to link the discussions of Public historians and history educationalists. That aim of bridging an academic gap has been criticized some time age.
The outreach of the journal is indicated with 27,600 visits and 400,000 page-views per month.

References

External links
 Official website of Public History Weekly
 Publisher's website
 Review 2018 by Thomas Cauvin.

Weekly journals
History journals
English-language journals
Publications established in 2013
De Gruyter academic journals